Lagaligo Stadium is a multi-purpose stadium in Palopo, Indonesia.  It is currently used mostly for football matches, and is the home stadium of Gaspa Palopo, a club competing in Liga Indonesia First Division. The stadium holds 10,000.

Tournament

References

Sports venues in Indonesia
Football venues in Indonesia
Multi-purpose stadiums in Indonesia
Buildings and structures in South Sulawesi